Sitampet railway station (station code:STPT), is an Indian Railways station nearby Eluru city of Andhra Pradesh. It lies on the Vijayawada–Nidadavolu loop line of Howrah–Chennai main line and is administered under Vijayawada railway division of South Central Railway zone. It halts for 8 trains every day.

History 
The southern part of the East Coast State Railway (from Waltair to Vijayawada) was taken over by Madras Railway in 1901.

Electrification 
The Mustabad–Gannavaram–Nuzvid–Bhimadolu sector was electrified in 1995–96.

References

External links 
South Central Railway

Railway stations in West Godavari district
Vijayawada railway division
Railway stations in India opened in 1893
Railway stations in Eluru